Carlisle is an unincorporated community in Plaquemines Parish, Louisiana, United States.

References

Unincorporated communities in Plaquemines Parish, Louisiana
Unincorporated communities in Louisiana
Louisiana populated places on the Mississippi River
Unincorporated communities in New Orleans metropolitan area